Blackburn by-election  may refer to:
Blackburn by-election, 1853
Blackburn by-election, 1869
Blackburn by-election, 1875